The Income and Corporation Taxes Act 1988, also known as ICTA, was the foremost United Kingdom Act of Parliament concerned with taxation until the Income Tax Act 2007 and the Corporation Tax Act 2010. ICTA was enacted in order to consolidate a number of earlier legislative provisions covering taxation. Originally, ICTA primarily covered income tax (paid principally by individuals) and corporation tax (paid principally by companies). It is the longest Act of Parliament to have ever been written.

Overview

Section 660A

In its United Kingdom Tax Bulletin 64 (April 2003), the Inland Revenue (now HM Revenue and Customs) announced new guidance on the "settlements legislation". This is a body of law which seeks to prevent someone (known as the "settlor") from avoiding tax by reclassifying income as belonging to someone else (known as the beneficiary). The income is then taxed at the beneficiary's lower rate although the settlor continues to benefit from it. The legislation targets spouses and also parents seeking to divert income via their minor children.

Section 660A of the Act (added by the Finance Act 1995) covered this issue. Using the revised (April 2003) interpretation of s.660A, UK HMRC have been targeting businesses set up by spouses where they are aware that income is split between the spouses, and only one of them directly generates that income. In theory s.660A can apply to partnerships as well as limited companies, this has yet to be tested in the UK courts. In 2007 the interpretation was finally rejected by the Law Lords, resulting in the government proposing new legalisation to tackle the perceived abuse.

This section was repealed by the Income Tax (Trading and Other Income) Act 2005 with effect from 6 April 2005.

Amendments
Following the Tax Law Rewrite Project, sections relating to income tax have been substituted by the Income Tax (Earnings and Pensions) Act 2003, the Income Tax (Trading and Other Income) Act 2005 and the Income Tax Act 2007. These acts have abolished the schedular system of taxation for income tax; however, the schedular system still applies for the purposes of corporation tax.

ICTA has also been frequently amended by the Finance Acts that are enacted annually in the UK.

Sections relating to the House of Commons Members' Fund were amended by the House of Commons Members' Fund Act 2016.

See also
 Pensions in the United Kingdom
 List of Acts of Parliament of the United Kingdom Parliament, 1980-1999
 Taxation of Chargeable Gains Act 1992
 Capital Allowances Act 2001
 Income Tax (Earnings and Pensions) Act 2003
 Income Tax (Trading and Other Income) Act 2005
 Income Tax Act 2007
 Umbrella company
 UK labour law
 UK tax law

References

External links

United Kingdom Acts of Parliament 1988
Tax legislation in the United Kingdom
1988 in economics
Income tax in the United Kingdom